Lophenol, or 4α-methyllathosterol, also called 4-Methylcholest-7-en-3-ol, is a Metabolic intermediate of plant sterol biosynthesis.

See also
 24-Methylenelophenol

References

Sterols